Chino (feminine china) was a casta term used in colonial Mexico to refer to people of mixed ancestry. In the eighteenth century, individuals of mixed Amerindian and African ancestry came to be called chinos.

Historical usage
A Mexican Inquisition bigamy case in Mexico City labeled one woman variously as a china, loba, and parda, one example of a person shifting racial categorization.  In marriage applications where individuals had to include the names of their parents, chinos tended not to know this information.

Use in casta paintings 
When painters produced in the eighteenth century formal depictions of "castes" as envisioned by members of the elite, the term chino appears with no fixed definition. These paintings show father of one racial category, mother of another, and the offspring yet a third category.  In Mexican casta paintings, a ‘’chino’’ could refer to offspring of a Lobo (African + Indigenous) and Negra (pure African); Lobo and India (pure Indigenous woman); Mulatto (European + Negra) and an India; a Coyote and a Mulata; a Spaniard and Morisca (light-skinned woman with African ancestry); and a Chamicoyote and Indian woman.

Contemporary usage
The consummation of Mexican Independence in 1821 abolished the legal use of the casta system. The various casta terms fell out of popular usage and eventually a new, all-encompassing Mexican Mestizo identity emerged.

However, the use of Chino has survived in modern Mexican Spanish via the term pelo chino (Chino hair) when referring to curly hair. Although chino can mean Chinese in standard Spanish, the chino in pelo chino does not refer to Chinese people. Rather it refers to the curly hair of the Chino casta. Alluding to an intermediate hair type that is between the afro-textured hair of Africans and the wavy hair of Europeans.

See also
 Asian Mexicans- also referred to as "chinos" or "indios chinos" during the colonial era

References

African–Native American relations
Afro-Indigenous peoples of North America
Afro-Mexican
Indigenous peoples in Mexico
Latin American caste system
Spanish colonization of the Americas
Interracial marriage